Parens paraocci is a moth of the family Erebidae first described by Michael Fibiger in 2011. It is found in Taiwan.

The forewings are beige with few dark subterminal and terminal areas, including the fringes. There are six black costal dots. The crosslines are white and mostly invisible, except the terminal line which is marked by black interveinal dots. The fringes are black. The hindwings are grey throughout with an indistinct discal spot. The underside of the forewing is unicolorous brown, with three light yellow subapical spots on the costa. The underside of the hindwing is light grey with a discal spot.

References

Micronoctuini